Mulia may refer to :

Places and jurisdictions 
 Mulia, Numidia, an Ancient city and former bishopric in Numidia, now El-Milia in Algeria and a Latin Catholic titular see
 Mulia, Puncak Jaya, the capital of Puncak Jaya Regency, Indonesia
 Kampung Sungai Mulia, a village in Malaysia

Persons 
 Mulia (surname) (Malay linguistic family)
 Duli Yang Maha Mulia, a royal title in Malaysia, equivalent to His Royal Highness

Others 
 Real Mulia F.C., a Malaysian football club 
 Seri Mulia Sarjana School in Brunei
 University of Bunda Mulia in Indonesia
 Mulia Group, an Indonesian company